Frozen Ever After is a musical reversing Shoot the Chute  dark ride  in Epcot at the Walt Disney World Resort. Part of the Norway Pavilion of the Epcot's World Showcase section and Fantasyland at Hong Kong Disneyland, the attraction features scenes inspired by Disney's animated film Frozen as well as the 2015 animated short Frozen Fever. It opened on June 21, 2016, using the ride vehicles and track layout of the former Maelstrom attraction. Versions of the attraction are scheduled to open at Hong Kong Disneyland in the second half of 2023, at Tokyo DisneySea in Spring 2024, and Walt Disney Studios Park in 2025.

History
On September 12, 2014, Walt Disney World officials announced that the Maelstrom attraction would be replaced by an attraction based on Frozen. Maelstrom's final day of operation was October 5, 2014.

In June 2015, then-Disney Chief Operating Officer Tom Staggs revealed that plans for a Frozen attraction were discussed prior to the film's release, but were accelerated after the film's worldwide success. On responding to whether converting a portion of the Norway pavilion into an attraction based on a fictional place was appropriate for World Showcase, Staggs stated: "If the goal is to give people a taste of something like Scandinavia with the Norway pavilion, then Frozen would only increase the extent to which people would be drawn to it.  To me it doesn’t seem out-of-character at all."

Disney also released the first details on the new attraction and revealed its final name, "Frozen Ever After." The attraction uses the same ride vehicles and course that was used for Maelstrom. The Audio-Animatronic figures for the attraction feature improvements in facial animation that were first used on the Seven Dwarfs Mine Train, which opened in 2014 at the Magic Kingdom. The Audio-Animatronics are also the first ever all-electric Audio-Animatronics, with previous Audio-Animatronics using either pneumatics or hydraulics. While there are no new songs in the attraction, some of the original songs from Frozen have revised lyrics written by the original composers.

On May 20, 2016, Disney Parks revealed that the attraction would open June 21 that year. On opening day, the wait times were over five hours long, as the lines started in the China Pavilion. Epcot employees gave out ice cream and water bottles to guests in order to cool off in the hot sun.

Ride experience

The Frozen Ever After ride commemorates the anniversary of the day Princess Anna saved her sister, Queen Elsa, from an attempted assassination with an unselfish act of true love, thus thawing a frozen heart and ending the eternal winter. To celebrate the event, Elsa bestowed an "Official Summer Snow Day" upon the Arendelle citizenry, inspiring the amusement ride.

Advertisements promoting the winter festival are visible to guests as they queue for the ride. Guests travel through Wandering Oaken's Trading Post and Sauna, where they find Oaken in the sauna waving to them. Riders next board a boat and sail off into a winter wonderland, where they encounter Olaf and Sven greeting guests with a rendition of "Do You Want to Build a Snowman?". Guests then pass Grand Pabbie as he recounts the story of the film to a group of young trolls.

Riders next ascend a lift towards Elsa's ice palace. When they reach the top, they find Olaf ice skating and singing "For the First Time in Forever", failing comically with the lyrics. Guests soon pass a singing Anna and Kristoff, while Sven sits on the side with his tongue stuck to a pole. Two gates open and guests see Elsa, who is singing "Let It Go" while conjuring ice. The boats and riders then accelerate backwards down a small dip, passing images of Elsa creating the ice palace.

Guests next encounter Marshmallow and the Snowgies from Frozen Fever. The boat moves forward as Marshmallow spits out mist, passing through the mist, and down a short drop, at which an on-ride photo is taken. Riders then pass Arendelle Castle with fireworks bursting over top. Lastly, guests reach Anna, Elsa, and Olaf, who are singing "In Summer", as they return to the village and disembark.

See also
 List of Epcot attractions
 Norway Pavilion at Epcot
 List of Hong Kong Disneyland attractions
 List of Tokyo DisneySea attractions
 List of Walt Disney Studios Park attractions

References

External links

Amusement rides introduced in 2016
Amusement rides introduced in 2023
Amusement rides introduced in 2024
Amusement rides planned to open in 2024
Walt Disney Parks and Resorts attractions
Frozen (franchise)
Epcot
 Hong Kong Disneyland
Tokyo DisneySea
Walt Disney Studios Park
Dark rides
Audio-Animatronic attractions
Walt Disney Parks and Resorts gentle boat rides
Norway in fiction
World Showcase
Arendelle: World of Frozen
Fantasy Springs (Tokyo DisneySea)
2016 establishments in Florida
2023 establishments in Hong Kong